There were four Greek letter special forces Reconnaissance Projects formed by the Military Assistance Command, Vietnam, MACV during the Vietnam War to collect operational intelligence in remote areas of South Vietnam.

Mission
Their mission include operational and strategic reconnaissance into long held Vietcong areas and direct air strikes on them, they were also to conduct bomb damage assessment, conduct small scale reconnaissance and hunter-killer operations, capture and interrogate VC / NVA tap communications, bug compounds and offices, rescue downed aircrew and prisoners of war, emplace point minefields and other booby traps, conduct Psychological Operations, and perform counter intelligence operations. 

They were to focus on base areas and infiltration routes in the border areas.

Operations
These missions were carried out by small US Special Forces and native personnel reconnaissance teams and Roadrunner teams posing as the VC. Battalion sized Reaction Forces were assigned to each project with their mission being to assist in the extraction of a compromised team and also to conduct raids and other economy of force type operations.

The Projects
There were four Greek Letter reconnaissance Projects:

 Project DELTA
 Project GAMMA
 Project SIGMA
 Project OMEGA

References

 Stanton, Shelby, Vietnam Order of Battle, 
 Sorley, Lewis, A Better War: The Unexamined Victories and Final Tragedy of America's Last Years in Vietnam,

See also
 5th Special Forces Group (United States)
 MACVSOG
 Project GAMMA

Military units and formations of the Vietnam War
Military of South Vietnam
V
Special forces of South Vietnam
Special Operations Forces of the United States